is a Japanese actress, voice actress and narrator from Tokyo, Japan.

Filmography

Anime

Television
1980s
 The Wonderful Adventures of Nils (1980) – Gacho
 Maicching Machiko-sensei (1981) – Hiromi
 Urusei Yatsura (1981)
 Yume no Hoshi no Button Nose (1985) – Prince Flower
 Uchuusen Sagittarius (1986)
 Ai Shōjo Porianna Monogatar (1986) – Mary
 Bug tte Honey (1986) – Midori
 Fight! Kickers (1986) – Hideo Obata
 Ahiru no Quack (1989)
 Madō King Granzort (1989) – Rabi
 Patlabor The Mobile Police (1989) – Tamiko Shinshi
1990s
 Madō King Granzort: Non-Stop Rabi (1990 special) – Rabi
 Trapp Ikka Monogatari (1991) – Rupert
 Future GPX Cyber Formula (1991) – Miki Jonouchi, Young Hayato
 Oniisama E... (1991) – "Mona Lisa no Kimi" Komazawa
 Watashi to Watashi: Futari no Lotte (1991) – Linne Kogel
 Space Oz no Bouken (1992) – Toma
 Calimero (1992) – Calimero
 Miracle Girls (1993) – Yuuhei (ep 14)
 Mobile Suit Victory Gundam (1993) – Kate Bush
 Iron Leaguer (1993) – Watt
 Shima Shima Tora no Shimajirou (1993) – Peizuri, Mimirin's Mother
 Sailor Moon S (1994) – U Henshu (ep 113)
 Huckleberry Finn Monogatari (1994) – Tom
 Blue Seed (1994) – Jun
 Wedding Peach (1995) – Nocturne
 Bakusou Kyoudai Let's & Go (1996) – Yoshie Seiba
 Ie Naki Ko Remi (1996-1997) – Mattia, Pierre (ep 3)
 Bakusou Kyoudai Let's & Go WGP (1997) – Michael, Yoshie Seiba
 Tenchi in Tokyo (1997) – Masayo Manuketa
 AWOL - Absent WithOut Leave (1998) – Amanda
 Fancy Lala (1998) – Pigu, Saburo Furuhata (ep 21)
2000s
 Nintama Rantaro (2004) – Mikiemon Tamura
 Tweeny Witches (2004) – Menow (Sheila's Mother)
 Jagainu-kun (2004) – Jagainu

2010s
 Little Witch Academia (2017) – Daryl Cavendish

Films
 Urusei Yatsura: Lum The Forever (1986)
 The Foxes of Chironup Island (1987) – Koro
 Bug tte Honey: Megaromu Shoujo Ma 4622 (1987) – Midori
 Mobile Suit Gundam: Char's Counterattack (1988) – Kayra Su
 Patlabor 2: The Movie (1993) – Tamiko Shinshi
 Space Travelers (2000) – Tanner

Original video animation (OVA)
 Madō King Granzort: The Final Magical Battle (1990) – Rabi
 Hakkenden: Legend of the Dog Warriors (1990) – Nabiki
 Madō King Granzort: Bōken-hen (1992) – Rabi
 Future GPX Cyber Formula 11 (1992) – Miki Jonouchi
 New Cutey Honey (1994) – Scorpion (ep 7)
 Future GPX Cyber Formula Zero (1994) – Miki Jounouchi
 Future GPX Cyber Formula: Early Days Renewal (1996) – Miki Jonouchi
 Future GPX Cyber Formula Saga (1996) – Miki Jyonouchi
 Pendant (1997) – Kenta (ep 3; + unlisted credits)

Video games
 Bakusou Kyoudai Let's & Go!! Eternal Wings (????) – Michael
 Kingdom Hearts Birth by Sleep (????) – Drizella
 Spyro x Sparx: Tondemo Tours (2000) – Elora

Tokusatsu
 Chōriki Sentai Ohranger (1995) – Butler Kocha
 Chōriki Sentai Ohranger Movie (1995) – Butler Kocha
 Juken Sentai Gekiranger (2007) – Five Venom Fist Confrontation Beast Scorpion-Fist Sorisa

Dubbing

Live-action
Jennifer Aniston
Friends – Rachel Green
The Good Girl – Justine Last
Bruce Almighty – Grace Connelly
Along Came Polly – Polly Prince
The Break-Up – Brooke Meyers
Friends with Money – Olivia
Love Happens – Eloise
The Bounty Hunter – Nicole Hurley
The Switch – Kassie Larson
Just Go with It – Katherine Murphy
Wanderlust – Linda Gergnblatt
We're the Millers – Rose O'Reilly
Mother's Day – Sandy Newhouse
 Addams Family Values – Heather (Cynthia Nixon)
 American Splendor – Joyce Brabner (Hope Davis)
 Apollo 13 (1999 NTV edition) – Mary (Tracy Reiner)
 Bedazzled – Carol (Miriam Shor)
 Beverly Hills, 90210 – Donna Martin (Tori Spelling)
 BH90210 – Tori Spelling/Donna Martin
 Big Daddy – Layla Maloney (Joey Lauren Adams)
 Bill & Ted's Bogus Journey – Joanna (Sarah Trigger)
 Born on the Fourth of July (VHS edition) – Jamie Wilson (Lili Taylor)
 Bullets Over Broadway – Olive Neal (Jennifer Tilly)
 Child's Play 2 – Kyle (Christine Elise)
 The Count – Miss Moneybags (Edna Purviance)
 Desperate Housewives – Edie Britt (Nicollette Sheridan)
 Diary of a Wimpy Kid series – Susan Heffley (Rachael Harris)
 ER – Chloe Lewis (Kathleen Wilhoite)
 Escape from L.A. – Taslima (Valeria Golino)
 The Firm – Tamara "Tammy" Hemphill (Holly Hunter)
 Fun with Dick and Jane – Jane Harper (Téa Leoni)
 Ghostbusters – Janine Melnitz (Annie Potts)
 Ghostbusters II – Janine Melnitz (Annie Potts)
 Ghostbusters: Afterlife – Janine Melnitz (Annie Potts)
 La Vie en rose – Édith Piaf (Marion Cotillard)
 Mother, May I Sleep with Danger? – Julie Lewisohn (Tori Spelling)
 Nemesis – Max Impact
 The Parent Trap – Elizabeth "Liz" James (Natasha Richardson)
 Pee-wee's Big Adventure – Dottie (E. G. Daily)
 Pink Cadillac – Lou Ann McGuinn (Bernadette Peters)
 Pretty in Pink – Iona (Annie Potts)
 Pulp Fiction – Honey Bunny (Amanda Plummer)
 Runaway Bride – Peggy Flemming (Joan Cusack)
 Scrooged – The Ghost of Christmas Present (Carol Kane)
 Seed of Chucky – Tiffany Valentine / Jennifer Tilly
 A Series of Unfortunate Events – Justice Strauss (Joan Cusack)
 Thomas and the Magic Railroad – Stacy Jones (Didi Conn)
 Twin Peaks (1990–91) – Lucy Moran (Kimmy Robertson)
 Twin Peaks (2017) – Lucy Brennan (Kimmy Robertson)
 The Vagabond – Gypsy Drudge (Edna Purviance)
 Waitress – Becky (Cheryl Hines)
 Will & Grace – Karen Walker (Megan Mullally)

Animation
Cinderella II: Dreams Come True – Drizella Tremaine
Cinderella III: A Twist in Time – Drizella Tremaine
Kid vs. Kat – Phoebe
Rex the Runt – Wendy
The Simpsons – Martin Prince, Todd Flanders
Sitting Ducks – Bev
W.I.T.C.H. – Yan Lin
X-Men (TV Tokyo edition) – Jean Grey

References

External links
 Shinobu Adachi at GamePlaza-Haruka Voice Acting Database 
 Shinobu Adachi at Hitoshi Doi's Seiyuu Database
 

1958 births
Living people
Japanese video game actresses
Japanese voice actresses
Voice actresses from Tokyo